Salvia baimaensis is a perennial plant that is native to Anhui province in China, growing on hillsides  at  elevation. Inflorescences are 6-flowered widely spaced verticillasters in racemes or panicles, with a  white corolla that is reddish on the middle lobe of the lower lip.

Notes

baimaensis
Flora of China